The following is a list of Malayalam films released in 1967.

References 

1967
Malayalam
 Mal
 1967
1967 in Indian cinema